HBCD may refer to:
 Hexabromocyclododecane, a brominated flame retardant
 Hiren's BootCD, an all-in-one live CD
 Highly branched cyclic dextrin, a carbohydrate